County Bridge No. 171 is a historic stone arch bridge located in Tredyffrin Township, Chester County, Pennsylvania. It spans Valley Creek.  It has three spans; the main span is 25 feet long and flanked by two 15-feet long spans.  The bridge was constructed in 1907, of coursed rubble with brick arch rings and a contrasting parapet.

It was listed on the National Register of Historic Places in 1988.

References 
 

Road bridges on the National Register of Historic Places in Pennsylvania
Bridges completed in 1907
Bridges in Chester County, Pennsylvania
National Register of Historic Places in Chester County, Pennsylvania
Stone arch bridges in the United States